Tiger Trap is the only album released by the band Tiger Trap. It was released in 1993 on K Records and was produced by Calvin Johnson. With about 10,000 copies sold, it was K Records' best-selling album until they released Beck's One Foot in the Grave the following year.

Critical reaction
In 2014, Andrew Earles called the album "quintessential", and wrote that on it, Tiger Trap "packed each song with at least one pop hook." In 2015, The A.V. Club's Jason Heller wrote that the album "embodies twee," but added that "it’s also a forceful, potent, consummately melodic complement to the more strident sounds of riot grrrl that were raging around them at the time."

Track listing 
 "Puzzle Pieces"
 "You're Sleeping"
 "Eight Wheels"
 "Supercrush"
 "Tore a Hole"
 "Words and Smiles"
 "For Sure"
 "You and Me"
 "Supreme Nothing"
 "Chester"
 "My Broken Heart"
 "Prettiest Boy"

References

1993 debut albums
K Records albums